Elena Zarubina (Plotnikova) (born 26 July 1978) is a Russian volleyball player with the Women's National Team, for which she made her debut in 1998.

She represented her country at the 2004 Summer Olympics in Athens, Greece, and
won the silver medal.
She participated at the 2003 FIVB World Grand Prix, and 2004 FIVB World Grand Prix.

Honours
 1998 World Championship — 3rd place
 1999 FIVB World Grand Prix — 1st place
 1999 European Championship — 1st place
 2001 FIVB World Grand Prix — 3rd place
 World Grand Champions Cup — 2nd place
 2001 European Championship — 1st place
 2002 FIVB World Grand Prix — 1st place
 2002 World Championship — 3rd place
 2003 FIVB World Grand Prix — 2nd place
 2004 Olympic Games — 2nd place

References

External links
 Personal site

1978 births
Living people
Russian women's volleyball players
Volleyball players at the 2004 Summer Olympics
Olympic volleyball players of Russia
Olympic silver medalists for Russia
Olympic medalists in volleyball
Medalists at the 2004 Summer Olympics
Sportspeople from Moscow
20th-century Russian women
21st-century Russian women